Bang Bon Nuea is a khwaeng (subdistrict) of Bang Bon District, in Bangkok, Thailand. In 2020, it had a total population of 22,619 people.

References

Subdistricts of Bangkok
Bang Bon district